Charlie Bradberry (June 28, 1982 – October 7, 2006) was an American NASCAR driver who ran part-time in the NASCAR Craftsman Truck Series in 2003 and 2004.  His best finish was 16th at Memphis Motorsports Park in 2003.  He was the brother of Gary Bradberry, who ran a number of Winston Cup races in the 1990s.

On October 7, 2006, Bradberry was killed in a one-truck accident while returning home from working on his racing vehicles. He was survived by his unborn son at the time, Charles Tucker Bradberry born February 8, 2007.

Bradberry, a star in late model stock cars on various tracks in the Southeast, had garnered some interest among Busch Series team owners and could have run in that series in 2007, had he lived.

Motorsports career results

NASCAR
(key) (Bold – Pole position awarded by qualifying time. Italics – Pole position earned by points standings or practice time. * – Most laps led.)

Busch Series

Craftsman Truck Series

References

External links
 
 

1982 births
2006 deaths
People from Chelsea, Alabama
Racing drivers from Alabama
NASCAR drivers
CARS Tour drivers
Road incident deaths in Alabama